"In the Blood" is a song written and recorded by American singer-songwriter John Mayer. The song was released on May 1 as the third single from Mayer's seventh studio album The Search for Everything, following "Love on the Weekend" and "Still Feel Like Your Man". It is Mayer's first song officially released to country radio.

Lyrics
The song mentions Mayer's family influence. In his interview with NPR, Mayer said, "It's turning around and pointing at yourself and going 'What's in there?' It's a certain time in your life where you just want to turn yourself upside down and shake everything out and go."

Personnel
 John Mayer – vocals, guitar
 Steve Jordan – drums, percussion
 Pino Palladino – bass
 Larry Goldings - keys
 Greg Leisz - lap steel
 Sheryl Crow - vocals

Production
 John Mayer – producer
 Chad Franscoviak – producer, recording engineer
 Steve Jordan - executive producer
 Martin Pradler – digital editor 
 Manny Marroquin – mixing engineer
 Chris Galland – mixing engineer
 Jeff Jackson – assistant engineer
 Robin Florent – assistant engineer
 Greg Calbi – mastering engineer

Themes
The song explores the relationship dynamics in his family and how that may have impacted the way he loves.  Scott Conklin with Medium says of the song "that Mayer is wondering if the reason he is the way he is is because its something innate in his family. It’s heavy stuff." Gabrielle Ginsberg of Hollywood Life found the record "relatable for anyone who feels like there’s too much of their parents’ personalities in them (and not in a good way)." Mayer has said it's the song that makes him feel the most on the album, and while hesitant to explain it, saying, "If I was gonna go that honest on a song, I wasn't gonna necessarily be a liability to it and color it in," he also said, "When I listened to that back, it was like an anthem for me, about me...[during] a certain time in your life where you just want to turn yourself upside down and shake everything out and go, 'Where's the loose change? What is in here?'"

Critical response
Entertainment Weekly said the song was "perhaps the first ballad to explore nature versus nurture."

Commercial performance
The song became Mayer's first entry on the Billboard country chart. It debuted at number 59 on Country Airplay and reached its peak number 57 the following week. It peaked at number 39 on Hot Country Songs.

Charts

Weekly charts

Year-end charts

Cover version
The song was covered by American a cappella group Home Free. The music video of the cover version was released on August 30, 2017.

Certifications

References

External links

2017 singles
2017 songs
2010s ballads
John Mayer songs
Songs written by John Mayer